Axiothauma is a genus of tephritid  or fruit flies in the family Tephritidae.

Species
Axiothauma albinodosum Munro, 1946
Axiothauma edwardsi Munro, 1946
Axiothauma nigrinitens Munro, 1946

References

Tephritinae
Tephritidae genera
Diptera of Africa